Elizabeth "Lizzie" Holden ( Colvin, born 4 January 1990) is a retired Ireland women's field hockey international. She was a member of the Ireland team that played in the 2018 Women's Hockey World Cup final. Colvin has also won Irish Senior Cup and Women's Irish Hockey League titles with Loreto.

Early years, family and education
Lizzie Colvin is the daughter of Dr. Peter Colvin and Rosie Colvin. Colvin attended Portadown College, graduating in 2008. Between 2008 and 2013 she completed a Bachelor of Laws at Trinity College Dublin. Colvin's brother, Chris Colvin, is a rugby union player. In 2017–18 and 2018–19 he captained City of Armagh to two successive Ulster Senior Cup titles. He was also a member of the Queen's University that won the cup in 2013–14.

Domestic teams

Armagh
During the 2000s, while still a schoolgirl, Colvin was a member of the Armagh team that won six successive promotions, progressing from the seventh level of the Ulster leagues to the Women's Irish Hockey League. Colvin was an Armagh player when she made her senior Ireland debut.

Loreto
While studying at Trinity College Dublin, Colvin played for Loreto. In 2008–09 she was a member of the Loreto team that won the inaugural Women's Irish Hockey League title. She was also a member of the Loreto team won the 2009–10 Irish Senior Cup. She also played for Loreto in the 2011–12 final. Colvin's teammates at Loreto have included Nikki Symmons, Hannah Matthews, Alison Meeke and Nicola Daly. She left Loreto in 2017.

HGC
In 2011 Colvin played for HGC while on an Erasmus break.

Belfast Harlequins
In 2017 Colvin began playing for Belfast Harlequins in the Women's Irish Hockey League. Her teammates at Harlequins included Zoe Wilson and Jenny McAuley.

Ireland international
Colvin represented Ireland at A level before making her senior debut in June 2008 in a Celtic Cup match against France. Between August 2013 and January 2015 Colvin was an absentee from Ireland squads while recovering from an anterior cruciate knee ligament injury. In March 2015 Colvin was a member of the Ireland team that won a 2014–15 Women's FIH Hockey World League Round 2 tournament hosted in Dublin, defeating Canada in the final after a penalty shoot-out. In January 2017 she was also a member of the Ireland team that won a 2016–17 Women's FIH Hockey World League Round 2 tournament in Kuala Lumpur, defeating Malaysia 3–0 in the final. On 22 July 2017 at the 2016–17 Women's FIH Hockey World League Semifinals, in the seventh and eighth place play-off, Colvin scored the winner in a 2–1 win against India. Ireland's seventh-place finish in at the tournament eventually saw them qualify for the 2018 Women's Hockey World Cup.

Colvin represented Ireland at the 2018 Women's Hockey World Cup and was a prominent member of the team that won the silver medal. She featured in all of Ireland's games throughout the tournament, including the pool games against the United States, India  and England, the quarter-final against India, the semi-final against Spain and the final against the Netherlands.

Personal life

Occupation
Between 2014 and 2016 Colvin worked as a trainee solicitor with A&L Goodbody in Dublin. After qualifying as a lawyer in 2017 she began working as an employment law specialist with DWF in Belfast. Together with Gillian Pinder, Nicola Evans, Anna O'Flanagan and Deirdre Duke, Colvin was one of five lawyers in the Ireland squad at the 2018 Women's Hockey World Cup.

Engagement
In January 2018, while celebrating her 28th birthday in Salzburg, Austria, Colvin got engaged to Matthew Holden from South Africa. The couple met in 2012 while Colvin was on a four-month visit to New Zealand.

Honours
Ireland
Women's Hockey World Cup
Runners Up: 2018
Women's FIH Hockey World League
Winners: 2015 Dublin, 2017 Kuala Lumpur
Women's FIH Hockey Series
Runners Up: 2019 Banbridge
Women's Four Nations Cup
Runners Up: 2017
Women's Field Hockey Olympic Qualifier
Runners Up: 2012
Loreto
Women's Irish Hockey League
Winners: 2008–09: 1
Runners Up: 2011–12, 2012–13, 2014–15: 3 
Irish Senior Cup
Winners: 2009–10: 1 
Runners Up: 2011–12: 1

References

External links
 Lizzie Holden (née Colvin) at Hockey Ireland
 
 
 
 

1990 births
Living people
Ireland international women's field hockey players
Female field hockey players from Northern Ireland
Irish female field hockey players
British female field hockey players
HGC players
Belfast Harlequins field hockey players
Female field hockey midfielders
Expatriate field hockey players
Women's Irish Hockey League players
Expatriate sportspeople from Northern Ireland in the Netherlands
Sportspeople from County Armagh
People educated at Portadown College
Alumni of Trinity College Dublin
Women lawyers from Northern Ireland
21st-century Irish lawyers
21st-century women lawyers
Field hockey players at the 2020 Summer Olympics
Olympic field hockey players of Ireland